Ofer may refer to:

People

Surname
Avraham Ofer (1922–1977), Israeli politician
Eyal Ofer (born 1950), Monaco-based Israeli business magnate
Gil Ofer (born 1976), Israeli Olympic judoka
Idan Ofer (born 1955), London-based Israeli business magnate and philanthropist
Sammy Ofer (1922–2011), Romanian-born, Monaco-based Israeli shipping magnate and philanthropist
Yuli Ofer (1924–2011), Romanian-born Israeli business magnate
Zvi Ofer (1932–1968), Israeli war hero

Given name
Ofer Berkovich (born 1965), Israeli basketball coach 
 Offer Eshed (1942-2007), Israeli basketball player
 Ofer Fleisher (born 1966), Israeli basketball player
 Ofer Yaakobi (born 1961), Israeli basketball player
Ofer Zeitouni (born 1960), Israeli mathematician

Other uses
Ofer (moshav), a moshav in Israel
Ofer Prison, an Israeli incarceration facility on the West Bank
Ofer Brothers Group, an Israeli shipping company

See also
Ofir (disambiguation)
Ophir (disambiguation)